Leslie Graham Wormald (19 August 1890 – 10 July 1965) was an English rower who competed in the 1912 Summer Olympics representing Great Britain.

Wormald was born at Maidenhead. He was educated at Eton College where he only rowed in the second eight and then at Magdalen College, Oxford, where his rowing showed considerable improvement. In 1910 he was in the Magdalen boat which finished the Head of the River and which won the Grand Challenge Cup at Henley Royal Regatta. In 1911 he was in the winning Oxford crew in the Boat Race and in the Magdalen boat which won the Grand at Henley again. In 1912 he was in the winning Oxford crew in the Boat Race again. He joined Leander Club and was a member of the Leander eight which won the gold medal for Great Britain rowing at the 1912 Summer Olympics. In 1913, Wormald was in the winning Oxford crew in the Boat Race for the third time.

Wormald served in the First World War and won a Military Cross while in France in 1918.

Wormald retired to Spain and died at the Hyde Park Hotel in London (today called the Mandarin Oriental Hyde Park, London) on a visit to England.

See also
List of Oxford University Boat Race crews

References

External links
 
 
 
 

1890 births
1965 deaths
People educated at Eton College
Alumni of Magdalen College, Oxford
British male rowers
English male rowers
English Olympic medallists
Olympic rowers of Great Britain
Rowers at the 1912 Summer Olympics
Olympic gold medallists for Great Britain
Oxford University Boat Club rowers
Olympic medalists in rowing
Members of Leander Club
Medalists at the 1912 Summer Olympics
Recipients of the Military Cross